Chemainus River Provincial Park is a provincial park in British Columbia, Canada.

History
The park was established on December 30, 1959. It occupies 119 hectares. It is managed by the Cowichan Valley Regional District.

Cultural Heritage
Chemainus River Park occupies what was once the traditional territories of the Nanaimo First Nation, the Chemainus First Nation, the Cowichan Indian Band and the Cowichan Tribes. The indigenous people used this area for fishing, berry picking and bark stripping. The park also contains the vestiges of an historically significant railway grade.

Facilities
Unlike many other camps in British Columbia, the Chemainus River Provincial Park does not permit camping or campfires. There are facilities for numerous other activities, including canoeing, cycling, fishing, hiking, horseback riding and swimming.

References

Provincial parks of British Columbia
Mid Vancouver Island
1959 establishments in British Columbia